India men's national water polo team is the representative for India in International Men's water polo. Water Polo in India is administered by the Swimming Federation of India (SFI). India's Men's best performance was when they won gold at the 1951 Asian Games. The India men's national water polo team also won a silver medal at the 1970 Asian Games, losing to Japan, 4 goals to 3 in the finals. The next time India won a medal was a bronze at the 1982 Asian Games.

India's Men's Team at the Olympics

Olympic Games
1948  — 12th place
1952  — 21st place

India's Men's Team at the Asian Games

Asian Games
 1951  –  Gold Medal
 1970  –  Silver Medal
 1974  – 6th place
 1982  –  Bronze Medal
 1986  – 6th place

India's Men's Team at the Asian Championships 
2022  – 9th place

2018 Asian Games 
As of July 2018, as per the Swimming Federation of India (SFI)'s announcement of the team for the Asian Games, the team stood as follows:

Aneesh Babu (GK), Akshay Kumar Kunde, Ashwini Kumar Kunde, Adarsh VS, Uday Uttekar, Prithish Das, Sarang Vaidya, Aneesh Kumar, Karthik Ch Das, Shibin Lal, Manimaran D, S Ratheesh Kumar, Monjith Hasan, Lal Krishna, and J Shreejith.

However, later the Indian Olympic Association decided against sending the Men's National Water polo team to the 2018 Asian Games.

References

Water polo
Men's national water polo teams
National water polo teams in Asia
National water polo teams by country
 
Men's sport in India